Beruwala (Sinhala:බේරුවල Tamil: பேருவளை) is a large town in Kalutara District, Western Province, Sri Lanka, governed by an Urban Council.

Etymology  
The name Beruwala is derived from the Sinhalese word for the place where the sail is lowered. It marks the spot for the first Muslim settlement on the island, established by a Somali Sheikh Yusuf bin Ahmad al-Kawneyn. The town was originally named Berbereen in honour and respect of the Somali Shaikh. The Chinese also traded here and Beruwala was known to them as Piehlo-li.

History
The first Muslim settlement of Sri Lanka was in Beruwala which is situated in the Western coastal area of the Island. Beruwala was named "Berbereen" in the past in honor of Yusuf bin Ahmad al-Kawneyn who is also known as Shaykh Abu Barakat al Barbari, a Somali Muslim scholar and a traveler who founded the city.

As a result of Arabs arriving and settling down in the western coastal areas of Sri Lanka such as Beruwala between the 10th to 12th centuries AD, Beruwala became a popular city for Unani medicine. During the 10th century Prince Jamal-ud-din, the son of Sultan of Konya arrived in Beruwala to practice Unani medicine. Eventually, Unani medicine was spread to many other parts of Sri Lanka and Unani Physicians can still be found in Beruwala and around Sri Lanka at present.

As a result of the relationship between the Muslims and the Sinhalese, Sri Lanka has had a Muslim Ruler called Vathimi Raja, also known as Vathimi Deiyo, who reigned in Kurunegala for a brief period during the 14th century. Vathimi Raja was a son of Buvanekabahu I, who married a Muslim spouse from Beruwala, the daughter of one of the chiefs. Vathimi Raja was first seen by the Arab traveler Ibn Batuta during his visit to Sri Lanka in 1344 while Vathimi Raja's son Parakrama Bahu II (Alkeshwara II) was a Muslim while the lineage of Alkeshwara Kings was ended in 1410.

The Vathimi Rajapura Housing Scheme in Beruwala was built in memory of Vathimi Raja and opened in the 1980's by the local Member of Parliament Alhaj M. A Bakeer Markar when he was then Speaker of the Parliament. M. A Bakeer Markar was once the acting Head of State of Sri Lanka, for a brief period in 1981, when President J. R. Jayewardene and Prime Minister Ranasinghe Premadasa left for England to attend the Royal Wedding of Prince Charles and Lady Diana Spencer.

Alhaj M. I. M Naleem, a gem merchant and local philanthropist contributed much for the development of Islamic culture, tradition, and education in Beruwala, and he was also the founder of Naleemiah Institute of Islamic Studies.

Demographics  
Beruwala is a multi-religious, multi-ethnic, and multi-cultural town. The population of Beruwala is predominantly Sri Lankan Moors with a mix of numerous other ethnic groups, including Sinhalese, Sri Lankan Tamils, and Burghers.

Ethnicity according to Beruwala Urban Area (2007)

Source:statistics.gov.lk

Geography 

Climate

The climate in Beruwala is tropical. A significant amount of rainfall can be seen in Beruwala during the year. According to Köppen and Geiger, this climate is classified as Af. The average annual temperature is 26.3 °C | 79.3 °F in Beruwala. April being the warmest month, December has the lowest average temperature during the year in Beruwala.

Attractions
 Ketchchimalai Mosque, one of Sri Lanka's oldest mosques, constructed by Arab traders.
 Masjid Al Abrar, claimed to be the first Muslim Mosque of Sri Lanka, built in 920 ADs, presumably by Arab traders who frequented Sri Lanka by sea.
 Barberyn Lighthouse, lighthouse on Barberyn Island.

Infrastructure

Transport

Roads
Beruwala is served by the A2 highway, which runs past the town.

Railway
Beruwala railway station, is in the Coastal Line, connecting Colombo to Matara and Beliatta.

Fishery Harbour
Beruwala Fishery Harbour is in the coastal stretch of Beruwala which is a naturally protected area used by merchant vessels for hundreds of years as a Port. It is said that the current Fishery Harbour could have been used as a port since the British Ceylon period.

The Fishery Harbour in Beruwala was initially constructed in 1965 by the Ceylon Fisheries Corporation. And since 1972 the maintenance and operations of the Fishery Harbour is carried out by the Ceylon Fishery Harbours Corporation.

Education
Education institutions in Beruwala have a long history. Beruwala has many schools some of which are government-owned, and others are private. Beruwala has got the first and the oldest Muslim girls School in Sri Lanka which is Al Fasiyathul Nasriya Muslim Balika Navodaya Vidyalaya situated in the coastal area in Maradana, Beruwala. The school was heavily damaged by the tsunami-Indian Ocean earthquake and was repaired subsequently. An Islamic University is situated in Beruwala which is known as Naleemiah Institute of Islamic Studies also known as Jamiah Naleemiah was established in 1974 which provides seven years of Islamic Curriculum along with the Government curriculum.

Government Schools

Al Fasiyathul Nasriya Muslim Balika Navodaya Vidyalaya
Naleem Hajiar Muslim Balika Vidyalaya (National School)
Al Humaisara National School
Z.A.M Refai Hajiar Maha Vidyalaya (National School)
I.L.M Samsudeen Vidyalaya
D.S Senanayake National School
Ariyawansha Maha Vidyalaya
Massala Primary School
Beruwala Buddhist Junior School

Government and politics

Local government

Beruwala is governed by an Urban Council. The Chairman and Council members are elected through local government elections held once in four years. During the past, the Council has been controlled by the United National Party and the Sri Lanka Freedom Party. Following the 2018 Local Authority elections, an independent alignment supported by former Chairmen Mazahim Mohamed, Marjan Faleel MP and former Chairman of Beruwala UC, and Milfer Caffoor former Chairman of Beruwala UC  won the elections. Mazahim Mohamed was subsequently appointed the Chairman and Munawar Rafaideen as Vice chairman of Beruwala Urban Council.

The Council Government provides sewer, road, and waste management services. The Urban Council liaises with the water supply and drainage board, the Ceylon electricity board and telephone service providers for Water, electricity, and telephone utility services.

City Limits

Beruwala is divided into nine Wards or divisions.

Twin towns and sister cities

Beruwala is twinned with:

 Reading, United Kingdom [2004]

References

External links

Seaside resorts in Sri Lanka
Populated places in Western Province, Sri Lanka